Mont Bégo is a mountain in the Mercantour massif of the  Maritime Alps, in southern France, with an elevation of . It is included in the Vallée des Merveilles ("Valley of Marvels").

Etymology 
The name derives from the ancient Indo-European root beg, meaning "divine"; it was, in fact a sacred area to the Liguri tribe, together with the Monte Beigua and Monte Sagro in Italy.

Geology 
It is mostly composed of conglomerates from the Permian period.

SOIUSA classification 
According to the SOIUSA (International Standardized Mountain Subdivision of the Alps) the mountain can be classified in the following way:
 main part = Western Alps
 major sector = South Western Alps
 section = Maritime Alps
 subsection = (Fr:Alpes Maritimes d.l.s.l./It:Alpi Marittime)
 supergroup = (Fr:Massif Gelas-Grand Capelet/It:Gelas-Grand Capelet) 
 group = (Fr:Chaîne Basto-Grand Capelet/It:Costiera Basto-Grand Capelet) 
 subgroup = (Fr:Nœud du Mont Bego/It:Nodo del Monte Bego) 
 code = I/A-2.1-A.3.e

References

Mercantour National Park
Mountains of Alpes-Maritimes
Mountains of the Alps
Two-thousanders of France